Picker may refer to:

 Picker (surname), including a list of people so named
 A farmworker at harvest time
 Picker, a slang word for a player of a string instrument such as a guitar or banjo
 A common job title for order picking in a warehouse
 A person who finds valuable items in other people's junk, as featured in the TV show American Pickers

See also
 
 
 Pick (disambiguation)
 Piquer (disambiguation)